Alexander McLagan Ross (April 20, 1829 – March 31, 1901) was a Canadian banker and politician, who served as a Member of the Legislative Assembly of Ontario for Huron West from 1875 to 1890 as a Liberal member. He was provincial treasurer from 1883 to 1890.

He was born in Dundee, Scotland, the son of Colin Ross and Elizabeth McLagan, and came to Upper Canada with his family in 1834. He served as a clerk in the Bank of Upper Canada and was manager for the Royal Canadian Bank and then the Canadian Bank of Commerce at Goderich. In 1852, he married Agnes Kydd. In 1858, he was named treasurer for the united counties of Huron and Bruce. He continued to serve as treasurer for Huron from 1866 to 1883 after the two counties were split. Ross also served as Commissioner of Agriculture for the province from 1883 to 1888. In 1890, he was named county clerk for York County. He was a lieutenant-colonel in the local militia and served during the Fenian raids.

External links 
The Canadian parliamentary companion, 1889 JA Gemmill

The Canadian men and women of the time : a handbook of Canadian biography HJ Morgan (1898)

1829 births
1901 deaths
Finance ministers of Ontario
Ontario Liberal Party MPPs
Scottish emigrants to pre-Confederation Ontario
People of the Fenian raids
People from Dundee
Politicians from Dundee
Immigrants to Upper Canada